The 2019–20 Luxembourg National Division was the 106th season of top-tier association football in Luxembourg. The season began on 3 August 2019 and the last matches were played on 8 March 2020.

F91 Dudelange were the defending champions of the league.

On 28 April 2020, the league was abandoned due to COVID-19 pandemic. The title was not awarded, and no teams were relegated, with the league expanded to 16 teams next season for a transitional year.

Teams
RM Hamm Benfica and Rumelange were relegated after the previous season. Muhlenbach Blue Boys and Rodange 91 earned promotion from the Luxembourg Division of Honour and joined the league this season.

Stadia and locations

League table

Results
Before the season, each team was expected to play every other team in the league twice for a total of 26 matches each.

Season statistics

Top scorers

See also
 Luxembourg Cup
 Luxembourg Division of Honour

References

External links
 

1
Luxembourg National Division seasons
Luxembourg
Luxembourg